The International Federation of Trade Unions of Transport Workers (FIOST) was an International Trade Federation affiliated to the World Confederation of Labour (WCL).

History
The federation was established in 1921 at a conference in Lucerne, as the International Federation of Christian Trade Unions of Railway, Tramway and Other Transport Workers.  In 1955, it renamed itself as the International Federation of Christian Trade Unions of Transport Workers, and then in 1970 it dropped "Christian", to assume its final name.

In 2006, the WCL merged into the new International Trade Union Confederation, and FIOST dissolved, its former affiliates mostly joining the International Transport Workers' Federation.

The federation had four sections, covering aviation, railways, waterways, and road transport.

Leadership

General Secretaries
1921: H. F. Timmermans
1940s: Vaassen
Jan van der Elst
1980s: Alfred Gosselin
Freddy Pools

Presidents
1921: F. L. D. Nivard
1940s: de Clerq
1950s: A. Meeuwissen
Benoit de Smet
1980s: John Janssens
Michel Bovy

References

Transportation trade unions
World Confederation of Labour
Trade unions established in 1921
Trade unions disestablished in 2006